In British, Australian, French, and Swiss railway signalling, an Annett's key is a form of trapped-key interlocking that locks levers or other items of signalling apparatus, thereby serving as a portable form of interlocking. The purpose is to prevent access from  sidings to the running line without authority. When not in use, the key is normally held in an Annett's lock that is fixed to the lever or concerned apparatus.

History 
The Annett's key takes its name from its inventor, J. E. Annett of the London, Brighton and South Coast Railway. Annett patented his design in 1875; in 1881 that patent was bought out by Saxby and Farmer.

Operation
In British usage, the key may be held in a locked container in the signal box that can only be opened when the corresponding signal lever is turned to danger for traffic on the running line; the lever is locked in position until the key is returned. Alternatively, the key may be attached to the train staff for the section of running line containing the entrance to the siding. At manually-worked level crossings remote from signal boxes the key to the gates can only be removed for use when the signals for the running line are locked at danger. 

In Australian usage, the key is carried on a specified locomotive.

See also 
 Glossary of rail transport terms

References 

Interlocking systems